Lilly Alfonso is a Malawian fashion designer. Fashion was one of her interests as a child, leading her to eventually become the CEO and founder of a fashion and design label named after herself. Her designs have been modeled in fashion shows in places such as London and Kuala Lumpur. Her label produces ready-to-wear clothing for both women and men under sub-labels LAwomann, LAmann

She won the Fashion Malawi Edition (FAME) Fashion Designer of the Year award in 2010. For two consecutive years (2019-2020) she was awarded the International Fashion Designer Award in Cairo, Egypt for her contributions to the industry. She also received a Fashion Living Legend Award at the 2020 UMP awards in Blantyre, Malawi. She has been interviewed by CNN, VOA and the BBC.

She has established the "100-Year Plan", aimed at educating and encouraging young people. She also offers free fashion and design lessons.

References

External links
Lilly Alfonso Official Website  Online store 
Malawian fashion designers
Living people
Year of birth missing (living people)